Nick Smith (born 9 November 1979) is a British milliner, fashion designer, and socialite.

Biography
Smith is best known as a hat designer or milliner. He is also a socialite, author, recording artist, actor, venture capitalist and philanthropist.

Smith studied fashion design and technology at the London College of Fashion and specialized in accessories and millinery. His millinery company is based in London; his central offices are based in Fifth Avenue, New York City and Liverpool, England.

Career

Millinery
Smith presented his début collection at the Cafe de Paris during the 2001 London Fashion Week.

In 2005, Smith presented an environmentally friendly clothing line at Mercedes-Benz Fashion Week Los Angeles using modal and other organic environmentally friendly fabrics.

In 2006, Smith won the Societas Style Award for designer of the year, which recognized his visionary talent of environmental ethical clothing.

In 2008, Vogue announced Smith's return to London Fashion Week with Murder by Millinery, a collection which features vintage Jimmy Choo shoes worked into bonnets, to raise money for charity and become a touring exhibition after the end of LFW. Smith told Vogue that "the collection mixes both couture and art".

Smith launched the “Wonderland” collection in 2010 at Dallas, Texas.

Other ventures
2007 Smith tried his hand at yet another venture, launching the world’s first organic, dairy free, gourmet designer chocolate: "couture du chocolat" in Selfridges.

References

External links
 Nick Smith Couture website
 Nick Smith Foundation website

1981 births
British fashion designers
English philanthropists
English socialites
21st-century English writers
Living people
British milliners
Designers from Merseyside